Coogan's Run is a 1995 UK TV series featuring Steve Coogan as a series of odd characters living in the fictional town of Ottle. It was written by various people including Coogan, Patrick Marber, David Tyler, Graham Linehan, Arthur Mathews, Geoffrey Perkins and Henry Normal.  The series consists of six self-contained stories, although Coogan's characters from the other episodes in the series make occasional cameo appearances.

Cast

 Steve Coogan - Paul Calf / Gareth Cheeseman / Ernest Moss / Peter Calf / Mike Crystal / Guy Crump / Tim Fleck
 John Thomson - Robin Moss
 Malcolm Raeburn - Inspector Lynch
 Teresa Banham - Debs
 Adrian Scarborough - Councillor Hillary Crabbe
 Philip Martin Brown - PC Ted Cornwall
 Roger Morlidge - Prison Officer 
 Derek Howard - Reverend Dowd
 John Clegg - Alf
 Patrick Marber - Stewart Crump

Episodes
In order of broadcast:

Get Calf featured the already well known characters Paul Calf and his sister Pauline (both played by Coogan). Paul gets into trouble with three criminal brothers after witnessing a bank robbery and being forced to identify them in court. He joins a cult and retreats to their residence where he is lured into a porn film.

In Dearth of a Salesman, Coogan plays the insensitive, egotistical computer hardware salesman Gareth Cheeseman. With similarities to Coogan's most famous creation, Alan Partridge, Gareth attempts to socialise and make a big sale during a sales conference while constantly checking to see if his car is safe.  Despite his faults, Gareth appears destined to land a big contract, but fate intervenes.

A Handyman For All Seasons: Main character Ernest Moss had previously appeared in live shows giving a safety lecture (as seen on the 1994 video release Live 'n' Lewd).  Set in 1960 and mostly filmed in black and white. Ernest Moss (Coogan), a general repairman, attempts to stop a large new property development in his home village while making repairs to his fellow villagers' homes. This episode also saw Coogan play the laddish Peter Calf, the father of Paul.

Thursday Night Fever: Mediocre club entertainer Mike Crystal (Coogan) invents an alter-ego, Clint Stallone, when his career begins to falter. The manager of his club, Clement (Graham Fellows), thinks Clint is real and gets his nephew to photograph him in a compromising position with Mike's girlfriend, Debs.

Natural Born Quizzers, featuring the mad, trivia-obsessive brothers Stewart and Guy Crump (Coogan and Patrick Marber). When the brothers lost a children's quiz show in 1975, they burned down the studio, killing their parents and one of the sisters from the opposing team. 20 years later, the brothers kidnap their therapist and the surviving sister, Cathy (Rebecca Front), and make them re-enact the quiz on the roof of a car park with the now-transsexual quiz host, Jeremy (Angela) Monkhead. It ends with Stewart and Guy taking the trophy and then detonating a bomb.

The Curator: Tim Fleck (Coogan), the curator of a very dull museum, is disgusted to find that his museum is being taken over to build a steak house upon his mother's death. On opening night, a masked man attacks the diners.

References

External links

BBC television comedy
1995 British television series debuts
1995 British television series endings